The Kitchen Tapes may refer to:

The Kitchen Tapes (Lori McKenna album), a 2003 demo album by Lori McKenna
The Kitchen Tapes (The Raincoats album), a 1983 live album by The Raincoats
The Kitchen Tape, a 1992 demo album by Weezer